The 2008 Wyre Forest District Council election took place on 1 May 2008 to elect members of Wyre Forest District Council in Worcestershire, England. One third of the council was up for election and the Conservative Party gained overall control of the council from no overall control.

After the election, the composition of the council was:
Conservative 22
Health Concern 10
Liberal 6
Labour 2
Liberal Democrats 2

Campaign
Before the election the Conservatives ran the council as a minority administration with them holding 18 seats, as compared to 10 for Health Concern, 7 Liberals, 3 Labour, 2 Liberal Democrats and 2 independents. 14 seats were contested at the election with the Conservatives defending 6, Liberals 3, independents 2 and Health Concern, Labour and Liberal Democrats 1 each.

The Conservatives needed to gain 4 seats to win a majority, but Health Concern were also hoping to make gains to take over as largest party on the council. Health Concern campaigned on issues including bringing more entertainment facilities to the council area and opposing a new fleet of black taxis, as well as their health policies.

Election result
The Conservatives won a majority on the council for the first time since 1979, after gaining 4 more seats to end the election with 22 councillors, while Health Concern stayed second with 10 seats. Among the Conservative gains were Mumshad Ahmed in Broadwaters ward, who became the first Asian councillor in Wyre Forest, and Julian Phillips in Bewdley and Arley, who became a councillor at the age of 23. Both Labour and the Liberals lost one seat to the Conservatives, while the two independent councillors were defeated.

The Conservatives described the results as an endorsement of their record, while Labour saw them as being due to anti-government feeling. The results were also reported as being a sign that the Conservatives could gain the parliamentary constituency at the next general election from Health Concern's Richard Taylor.

Ward results

By-elections between 2008 and 2010

Lickhill
A by-election was held in Lickhill on 10 September 2009 after the death of Health Concern councillor Jill Fairbrother-Millis. The seat was held for Health Concern by Jim Parish with a majority of 131 votes over Conservative Chris Rogers.

Areley Kings
A by-election was held in Areley Kings on 10 December 2009 after the death of Conservative councillor Mike Partridge. The seat was gained for Labour by James Shaw with a majority of 123 votes over Health Concern candidate Gary Talbot.

References

2008
2008 English local elections
2000s in Worcestershire